Uspavanka za Radmilu M. (trans. Lullaby for Radmila M) is the sixth studio album by the Yugoslav rock band Bijelo Dugme, released in 1983.

Uspavanka za Radmilu M. was Bijelo Dugme's last studio album recorded with vocalist Željko Bebek. Uspavanka za Radmilu M. is the band's first album since the 1977 live album Koncert kod Hajdučke česme to feature drummer Ipe Ivandić and the first one since the 1975 album Šta bi dao da si na mom mjestu to be recorded in the band's default lineup.

Background and recording

The band's leader, guitarist Goran Bregović, originally intended to release Uspavanka za Radmilu M. as Bijelo Dugme's farewell album and to dismiss the band after the promotional tour. Unlike the band's previous albums, Uspavanka za Radmilu M. was not followed by a large promotion in the media.

The album was recorded in Skopje. Uspavanka za Radmilu M. was the band's first album since the 1977 live album Koncert kod Hajdučke česme to feature drummer Ipe Ivandić, who returned to the band at the end of 1982, replacing Garabet Tavitjan, who performed with the band only on the 1982 Bulgarian tour. The album was produced by Bregović and Gajo Vučićević and featured Leb i Sol member Vlatko Stefanovski (guitar), Blagoje Morotov (double bass) and Arsen Ereš (saxophone) as guest musicians. It was mixed in Britannia Row Studios in London. The songs "Ako možeš zaboravi", "U vrijeme otkazanih letova", "Polubauk polukruži poluevropom" (trans. "Half-Spectre Is Half-Haunting Half-Europe", the title referring to the first sentence of The Communist Manifesto) and "Ovaj ples dame biraju" featured diverse sound, illustrating various phases in the band's career. The title track, which closes the album, is the only instrumental track Bijelo Dugme ever recorded.

The song "Kosovska" ("Kosovo Song") featured Albanian language lyrics. Written during delicate political situation in Socialist Autonomous Province of Kosovo, the song represented Bregović's effort to integrate the culture of Kosovo Albanians into Yugoslav rock music. Although lyrics were simple, dealing with rock music, the song caused certain controversies. Reminiscing on the song, Željko Bebek in 2017 described it as a "revolutionary move" and praised its "beautiful lyrics", but also said he was very reluctant to sing it because he felt that Bijelo Dugme was starting to take an overt political stance, something he was not comfortable with. In his view, the song introduced discord within Bijelo Dugme, which ultimately led to his departure from the band.

Album cover
The album cover was designed by Bijelo Dugme's old collaborator Dragan S. Stefanović. It featured an embossed print of a pillow on front and back cover.

Track listing 
All songs written by Goran Bregović, except where noted.

Personnel
Goran Bregović – guitar, producer
Željko Bebek – vocals
Zoran Redžić – bass guitar
Ipe Ivandić – drums
Vlado Pravdić – keyboards

Additional personnel
Vlatko Stefanovski – guitar (on tracks: 1, 9)
Blagoje Morotov – double bass
Arsen Ereš – saxophone
Gajo Vučević – producer
Mike Johnson – engineer, mixed by
Dragan S. Stefanović – design

Reception
The album received mostly negative reactions by the critics. Džuboks critic Ljubo Trifunović wrote:

Another Džuboks critic, Branko Vukojević, wrote: "It seems like Bijelo Dugme wanted to return, but had nothing to return to."

Unlike the band's previous releases, none of the tracks off Uspavanka za Radmilu M. managed to become hits. However, the tour was still very successful, and the audience's response made Bregović change his mind about dismissing the band.

Video album
The release of the Uspavanka za Radmilu M. album was followed by the release of an eponymous VHS cassette featuring videos for all the album tracks. The cassette also included some recordings from the concerts from the beginning of the Uspavanka za Radmilu M. tour. The cassette was the first project of the kind in the history of Yugoslav rock music. The videos were directed by Boris Miljković and Branimir "Tucko" Dimitrijević. The video for the song "Ovaj ples dame biraju" was the first gay-themed video in Yugoslavia.

Legacy

The song "Ako možeš, zaboravi" was polled in 2006 as the 51st on B92 Top 100 Yugoslav songs list.

The album's title track was used in 2006 mockumentary film Borat, but did not appear on the official soundtrack album.

Covers
 Croatian singer-songwriter and former Azra leader Branimir "Džoni" Štulić released a cover of "Ako možeš, zaboravi" on his official YouTube channel in 2011.
 Croatian pop singer Natali Dizdar covered the song "Ovaj ples dame biraju" on her 2012 live album ZKM Live.
 Serbian surf rock band Moussaka released a cover of "Ako možeš, zaboravi" on their 2014 EP Moussaka EP.

References

External links
Uspavanka za Radmilu M. at Discogs

1983 albums
Bijelo Dugme albums
Jugoton albums